Leilah Nadir is a Canadian novelist and writer.

Biography
She was born to an Iraqi father and an English mother, and she was raised in Britain and Canada.
Nadir holds a master's degree in English Literature from the University of Edinburgh, and also a Joint Honours bachelor's degree in English and History from McGill University.

Nadir has previously worked in both London and Vancouver in the publishing industry. Since the US-led invasion of Iraq, she has written numerous articles and broadcast political commentaries for CBC, The Globe and Mail, The Georgia Straight, and she has also published a feature article in Brick magazine. In September 2007, she published The Orange Trees of Baghdad: In Search of My Lost Family (Key Porter Books), which details her Iraqi father's story and her Iraqi family's experiences since the 2003 invasion of Iraq. The book includes family photographs as well as contemporary photos by acclaimed Iraqi Canadian photojournalist Farah Nosh; it was widely praised on publication, notably by Naomi Klein and Noam Chomsky. In July 2008, she won the George Ryga award for Social Awareness  in Literature. The Orange Trees of Baghdad was published in  Canada, Italy, Australia and New Zealand, France, Turkey, the UK Commonwealth and the USA.  
Nadir currently lives in Vancouver, British Columbia with her husband, son and daughter.

Bibliography
 The Orange Trees of Baghdad: In Search of My Lost Family

References

External links
Official Site

Living people
Year of birth missing (living people)
Alumni of the University of Edinburgh
Canadian women novelists
British emigrants to Canada
British people of Iraqi descent
Canadian people of Iraqi descent
Canadian people of Assyrian descent
Canadian non-fiction writers
Canadian writers of Asian descent
Canadian women non-fiction writers